Carcluie Loch (NS 34894 16186) is a small freshwater loch in the South Ayrshire Council Area, lying in a glacial Kettle Hole, Parish of Dalrymple, Scotland.

The loch
Blaeu's map of circa 1654 taken from Timothy Pont's map of circa 1600 shows Loch Luy and nearby the dwelling of Kar Cluy. In 1821 the farm was recorded as Kirklewy, but no loch shown. In 1832 Thomson's map shows a small loch at Carcluie. In the 1870s the OS map shows that the loch was roughly oval in shape, and of an extent of 0.709 hectares or 1.752 acres. The loch is fed by the Carcluie Burn and a burn running down the hill from the vicinity of the railway; the outflow runs down towards Broomberry.

Drainage
The loch's drainage may have begun in the early 18th century when Alexander Montgomerie, 10th Earl of Eglinton, was pursuing a number of agricultural improvements on his extensive estates. Further drainage work may have taken place in the 1740s as part of the improvements undertaken to provide employment for Irish estate workers during the Irish potato famines of the 1740s and the mid 19th centuries. Many drainage schemes also date to the end of World War I when many soldiers returned en masse to civilian life.

Island
Smith records that the former roughly circular island within the loch, having all the appearance of a crannog once had 'pile-heads' in the water around it. A casual inspection did not reveal any supporting evidence. Smith gives the spelling as 'Carclui'. The island is no longer visible (2011), the SW end of the loch being entirely overgrown with reeds. Probing at the position of the island shown on the OS 1:10,000 map recorded that the natural deposits in this part of the loch to be over 2m deep. A 1993 investigation sees the site as possessing an island and not a crannog.

Situation
The loch was on the route of the old road from Straiton to Kirkmichael and onto Dalrymple.

Natural history
Extensive areas of reeds (Phragmites sp.) are present. The site is listed on the WEBS register of the Wetlands Birds Survey scheme. The loch is a Scottish Wildlife Trust provisional wildlife site. The loch margins are dominated by rushes (Juncus sps) with willow scrub and a conifer plantation. Common house martins (Delichon urbicum) use the loch and its margins as a feeding area until late September.

See also

 Loch Fergus
 Lindston Loch, South Ayrshire
 Martnaham Loch
 Snipe Loch

References

Notes

Sources

 MacIntosh, Donald (2006). Travels in Galloway. Glasgow : Neil Wilson. .
 Smith, John (1895). Prehistoric Man in Ayrshire. London : Elliot Stock.

Lochs of South Ayrshire
History of South Ayrshire
Freshwater lochs of Scotland
Lakes of South Ayrshire